Canada competed at the 2014 Winter Paralympics in Sochi, Russia, from March 7 to 16, 2014.

Canada sent a team of 54 athletes to compete in all five sports, and finished with 7 gold medals and 16 overall (ranking 3rd and 4th respectively). This met the performance goal set by the Canadian Paralympic Committee on a top three finish in total gold medals.

Medalists

Alpine skiing

Men

Women

Snowboarding
Para-snowboarding made its debut at the Winter Paralympics and it was placed under the Alpine skiing program during the 2014 Games. Canada's para-snowboarding team was announced on January 26, 2014. Michelle Salt was added to the team on February 22, 2014.
Men

 Women

Biathlon 

Men

Women

Cross-country skiing

Men

Women

Relay

Ice sledge hockey

Roster

Preliminaries

Semifinal

Bronze Medal Game

Wheelchair curling

Team

Standings

Results

Draw 1
Saturday, March 8, 9:30

Draw 2
Saturday, March 8, 15:30

Draw 4
Sunday, March 9, 15:30

Draw 5
Monday, March 10, 9:30

Draw 6
Monday, March 10, 15:30

Draw 8
Tuesday, March 11, 15:30

Draw 9
Wednesday, March 12, 9:30

Draw 11
Thursday, March 13, 9:30

Draw 12
Thursday, March 13, 15:30

Semifinal
Saturday, March 15, 9:30

Gold medal game
Saturday, March 15, 15:30

See also
Canada at the Paralympics
Canada at the 2014 Winter Olympics

References

Nations at the 2014 Winter Paralympics
2014
Winter Paralympics